The following is a list of first deputy chairmen of the State Council of Bulgaria.

In the 1971–1990 period, the chairmen of the State Council — Todor Zhivkov (1971–1989) and Petar Mladenov (1989–1990) — were the heads of state of Bulgaria. The first deputy chairmen of the State Council were deputy heads of state. The State Council was abolished on April 3, 1990.

References

See also
Vice President of Bulgaria

Politics of Bulgaria
Bulgaria
First Deputy Chairmen of the State Council